Gotta Get Away may refer to:

"Gotta Get Away" (The Offspring song)
"Gotta Get Away" (The Black Keys song)
"Gotta Get Away" (Sweethearts of the Rodeo song)
"Gotta Get Away", a song by Robbie Glover
"Gotta Get Away", a B-side to the US release of "As Tears Go By" by The Rolling Stones
"Gotta Getaway", a song by Stiff Little Fingers from the album Nobody's Heroes, 1980